Cwmllynfell RFC are a Welsh rugby union club based in Cwmllynfell in South Wales. Cwmllynfell RFC is a member of the Welsh Rugby Union and is a feeder club for the Ospreys.

Club honours

 West Wales Champions: 1958-59,1959–60,1961–62
 WWRU Section B Champions: 1976,1984
 Division Six B Central Champions: 1997–1998
 WRU Division Four West - Champions: 1998–1999
 WRU Division Two West - Champions: 2004–2005
 West Wales (Tovali) Cup - Winners: 2006, 2016

Notable former players
  Les Anthony (3 caps)
  Howell Lewis (4 caps)
  Eddie Williams (2 caps)
 Tudor Williams (1 cap)

External links
Cwmllynfell RFC official site (archive)

References

Rugby clubs established in 1904
Welsh rugby union teams
Rugby union in Neath Port Talbot